Sugarbomb was a power pop band from Fort Worth, Texas.  After an independent release, Tastes Like Sugar, in 1999, they signed to RCA and released their second album, Bully, in 2001. However, RCA dropped them two weeks after the release. The single "Hello" reached number 34 on the Billboard Adult Top 40 chart.  Billboard writer Geoff Mayfield included Bully on his top ten albums list for 2001, writing in a brief summary that the band's name and album art were "silly... But, my, does it rock."  
The song Hello was included in the 2002 film, Van Wilder.
Jason Damas at PopMatters wrote of Sugarbomb, "a damn good sound that rocks hard and is catchy as all hell", comparing them to the Beach Boys, Todd Rundgren, XTC, and Queen.

Band members
Les Farrington – keyboards, lead vocals
Daniel Harville – guitar, lead vocals
Michael Harville – drums, vocals
Greg Bagby – guitar, vocals
Kelly Riley – bass

Albums
 Tastes Like Sugar (1999)
 Bully (2001)

References

External links
Sugarbomb at AllMusic

American power pop groups
Musical groups established in 1998